Mandla Maseko (27 August 1988 – 6 July 2019) was a South African aviator, who aimed to be the first black South African in space.

Biography 
He was born in Soshanguve, north Pretoria, to an auto tool maker and a school cleaner. He was a candidate officer of the South African Air Force, as well as a private pilot, a DJ, and a biker.

In 2013 he was one of 23 winners out of a million entrants to a competition by the Axe Apollo Space Academy to attend a US space academy, in order to be the first black South African in space. He was nicknamed "Afronaut" and "Spaceboy". He went to the Kennedy Space Center for a week to do tests, such as skydiving and a journey on a reduced-gravity aircraft, ahead of a planned one-hour suborbital flight on board a XCOR Lynx Mark II that was planned to take place in 2015. However, the flight did not happen as XCOR Aerospace went bankrupt in 2017. He would have been the third South African in space, after Mark Shuttleworth in 2002 and Mike Melvill in 2004.

He died on 6 July 2019 in a motorbike accident, aged 30.

References 

1988 births
2019 deaths
South African aviators
Astronaut candidates
South African Air Force personnel
Place of death missing
Motorcycle road incident deaths
People from Pretoria
South African DJs
Black aviators